Richard Shuttleworth Wingfield Digby (19 August 1911 – 29 January 2007) was the Dean of Peterborough in the Church of England from 1966 to 1980.

He was educated at the Nautical College, Pangbourne, and Christ's College, Cambridge. He was ordained in 1937 and began his ministry as a curate at St Andrew's, Rugby. He then became a chaplain to the Forces and was a prisoner of war from 1940 to 1945. When peace returned he became vicar of All Saints, Newmarket and then Rural Dean of Bury before his appointment to the deanery.

References

1911 births
People educated at Pangbourne College
Alumni of Christ's College, Cambridge
Deans of Peterborough
2007 deaths
World War II chaplains
British World War II prisoners of war
Royal Army Chaplains' Department officers